Nymphula coenosalis is a moth in the family Crambidae. It was described by Snellen in 1895. It is found on Sulawesi.

References

Acentropinae
Moths described in 1895